Statistics of JSL Cup in the 1978 season.

Overview
It was contested by 20 teams, and Mitsubishi Motors won the championship.

Results

Group A

Group B

Group C

Group D

Quarterfinals
Fujita Industries 2-1 Honda
Nippon Steel 1-0 Furukawa Electric
Mitsubishi Motors 2-0 Yanmar Diesel
Nippon Kokan 1-2 Yomiuri

Semifinals
Fujita Industries 3-2 Nippon Steel
Mitsubishi Motors 2-0 Yomiuri

Final
Fujita Industries 1-2 Mitsubishi Motors
Mitsubishi Motors won the championship

References
 

JSL Cup
League Cup